Eutrichillus is a genus of longhorn beetles of the subfamily Lamiinae. It was described by Henry Walter Bates in 1885.

Taxonomy
Species:

References

Acanthocinini